The Catholic Church in Venezuela is part of the worldwide Catholic Church, under the spiritual leadership of the Pope in Rome. The Roman Catholic Church in Venezuela comprises nine archdioceses, three vicariates, a military ordinariate, and two Eastern Rite exarchates under the spiritual leadership of the Pope, the Curia in Rome and the Venezuelan Bishops Conference.

According to The World Factbook, 2009, 96% of the population is Roman Catholic. In 2018, Latinobarómetro, estimated that 66% of the population is Roman Catholic.

Since the Second Vatican Council, the Roman Catholic Church in Venezuela has been weakened by a lack of diocesan and religious vocations. Many priests serving in Venezuela are foreign-born. Before president Hugo Chávez's government took power, Protestant churches began to successfully proselytize, especially among the urban poor. However, this has diminished in recent years. In the past, the Catholic Church did not have the funds, the personnel, or the enthusiasm to stem effectively this new challenge to its hegemony, but it believed it faced a greater threat with the new government of Hugo Chavez.

Although President Chávez self-identified as a practicing Roman Catholic, his policies have concerned the Venezuelan Roman Catholic hierarchy, especially in the area of religious education. Besides its universities and colleges, the Roman Catholic Church also administers some 700 other schools throughout the country, mostly subsidized by the Venezuelan state. In 2007, Cardinal Jorge Urosa, the Archbishop of Caracas, called for peaceful demonstrations against any direct government involvement in overseeing the Church's administration of schools. The Church has also been critical of the government for wanting to remove religious education from public schools during normal school hours.

Theology

The Catholic Church in Venezuela heavily focuses on the veneration of the Virgin Mary. This is exemplified by such figures as the Our Lady of Coromoto in Portuguesa state, Virgen del Valle in Nueva Esparta and Our Lady of the Rosary of Chiquinquirá in the western part of the country.

History
The history of Roman Catholicism in Venezuela dates back to the colonial period. Historically, the church has never been as prominent in Venezuela as it has in neighboring Colombia. In addition, that the Spanish clergy, in general, sided with their mother country rather than with the forces of independence, did not endear the church to the early Venezuelan patriots.

Colonial period
In 1515 Cumaná was the first European settlement founded in South America by Franciscans and Dominicans, but the monks there were being harassed by indigenous people and Spaniards operating slave raids from the nearby island of Cubagua. Friars founded it with the name of Nueva Toledo, due to successful attacks by the indigenous people, it had to be refounded several times. Bartolomé de las Casas, attempting a peaceful colonization scheme, was pre-empted by Gonzalo de Ocampo's 1521 punitive raids against the local indigenous people, in retaliation for the destruction of the Dominican convent at Chichiriviche.

Coro is the oldest city in the west of Venezuela. It was founded on July 26, 1527, by Juan de Ampíes as Santa Ana de Coro. It has a wide cultural tradition that comes from being the urban settlement founded by the Spanish conquerors who colonized the interior of the continent. It was the first capital of the Venezuela Province and head of the first bishop founded in South America. It was established on June 21, 1531, by the bull Pro Excellenti Praeeminentia of the Pope Clement VII. That diocese was suppressed on 20 June 1637 and its territory used to establish the Diocese of Caracas . Elevated to Metropolitan Archdiocese of Caracas by papal bull In universalis ecclesiae regimine issued by Pope Pius VII in the Basilica Santa Maria Maggiore in Rome on November 24, 1803, until this date having been a suffragan in the Ecclesiastical Province of the Archdiocese of Santo Domingo on Hispaniola, now in the Dominican Republic and primatial see of the Americas.

After the independence of Venezuela
Until the middle of the nineteenth century, the ranking clergy had close ties with the governing conservative oligarchy, and the church played a dominant role in the educational system. The rise to power of Liberals in the latter half of the nineteenth century, however, ushered in a period of anticlericalism. The government of Antonio Guzmán Blanco virtually crushed the institutional life of the church, even attempting to legalize the marriage of priests. These anticlerical policies remained in force for decades afterward.

20th century
It was not until the mid-twentieth century that, under the influence of the Christian social movement that began to criticize the maldistribution of wealth, the church regained some of its former influence.

Roman Catholic laymen played a prominent role in the founding of COPEI (Social Christian Party) in 1946, and the announced disapproval of the church contributed to the fall of the dictator Marcos Pérez Jiménez in 1958. In the 1960s, the involvement of the church in education and welfare increased and, although the church had no formal ties with COPEI, many believed that the support of clergymen and church-affiliated institutions contributed to the electoral successes of COPEI in 1968 and 1978.

Present day
According to some sources, the church in Venezuela has been weakened by a traditional lack of native vocations. Many priests serving in Venezuela are foreign-born (though currently the inclusion of foreign clergy seems to be encouraged by many bishops throughout the Catholic world, especially in the United States). Before the government of Hugo Chávez, charismatic Protestant churches began to proselyte successfully, especially among the urban poor, though this has not posed a threat to the church nearly as much as the new government of Hugo Chávez has, especially in relation to religious education in public schools and the running of the church's 700 religious schools.

Chávez was very dismissive of the role of the Catholic Church's bishops in Venezuelan society.

The Venezuelan Catholic Church has been vocal in opposing Maduro administration. Pope Francis have been vocally neutral during the 2019 Venezuelan presidential crisis.

The Episcopal Conference of Venezuela rejected Luis Parra claim to the presidency of the National Assembly during a disrupted Board of Directors internal election on 5 January 2020. Days later, Luis Parra tried to attend a meeting of the organization alongside armed forces but he was denied entry.

See also

List of Catholic dioceses in Venezuela
Evangelical Council of Venezuela
Pan-Amazonian Ecclesial Network (REPAM)

References

 
Venezuela
Venezuela
Political history of Venezuela
Venezuela
Roman Catholicism
Venezuela